Scott "Scotty" Smiley is a retired U.S. Army Major and United States Military Academy graduate. He was the U.S. Army's first blind active duty officer.

Military career

Smiley is from Pasco, Washington. After graduating from the United States Military Academy in West Point, New York in 2003 he then completed the Basic Officer Leaders Course and Ranger School both at Fort Benning, Georgia. He was then stationed at Fort Lewis, Washington where he led a platoon of 45 men.

While at West Point Smiley became friends with Edward Graham, the son of Franklin Graham. Smiley and Graham ended up entering the Army on the same day, were in Ranger School together and were in the same platoon.

On April 6, 2005, Smiley was wounded while partially exposed on the top of a Stryker in Mosul, Iraq when a suicide bomber blew up a car close by. Smiley fired two warning shots in front of the vehicle and then the car exploded which sent shrapnel into his eyes.

The shrapnel that entered Smiley's eyes left him blind and temporarily paralyzed. He woke up a week later in Walter Reed Army Medical Center. An Army medical review board later declared him mentally and physically fit to continue to serve. He then became the U.S. Army's first blind active duty officer.

Even though blind, Smiley earned a Master of Business Administration from Duke University's Fuqua School of Business. He also taught military leadership at West Point and led the Warrior Transition Unit at West Point's Keller Army Medical Center becoming the first blind officer to lead a company. Smiley also earned the Army's MacArthur Leadership Award.

Smiley remained physically active despite blindness. He tandem skydived with the U.S. Army's Golden Knights, skied in Vail, Colorado, surfed in Hawaii, climbed Mount Rainier and completed a Coeur d'Alene Ironman. The Army Times named then Captain Smiley "Soldier of the Year" in 2007 and ESPN awarded him an ESPY Award in 2008 for the best outdoor athlete.

In 2010 Smiley authored his biography Hope Unseen. He also received the "Father of the Year" award that same year in New York. He received the Christopher Award and the Louis Braille Award both in 2011. Smiley also holds an Honorary PhD from Mount Saint Mary College.

Smiley was invited to speak to the U.S. Men's Summer Olympic Games Basketball "Dream Team" before they earned gold medals in 2008 and 2012. In March 2012, he graduated from the Maneuver Captains Career Course at Fort Benning, Georgia and then had a position with the Gonzaga University ROTC Department in Spokane, Washington.

Smiley medically retired from the Army in 2015.

Post-military life

In 2018 Smiley received the Patriot of Hope Award in Beverly Hills, California and in that same year he and his family appeared on Dr. Phil to exhibit a special device that helps blind people read.

Smiley's wife, Tiffany Smiley, unsuccessfully ran in the 2022 United States Senate election in Washington. She received 42.7% of the vote.

Personal life
Smiley is a Christian.

Since Smiley was blinded in 2005, he has never seen his 3 children.

Awards and decorations
Major Smiley has received the following awards:

References

Year of birth missing (living people)
Living people
American blind people
Fuqua School of Business alumni
People from Pasco, Washington
United States Army officers
United States Military Academy alumni
United States Army personnel of the Iraq War